Henry Yager (28 November 1874 – 15 February 1915) was an Australian rules footballer who played with Fitzroy in the Victorian Football League.

Born in Fitzroy North to John G. Yager, who would later serve as Mayor of Fitzroy from 1892-93. Yager had a brother, Phillip, and two sisters, Lizzie and Mary.

After playing with the Fitzroy Juniors, Yager was part of Fitzroy's senior squad for the inaugural VFL season in 1897. He made his VFL debut in Round 9 on 3 July 1897 against St Kilda at Brunswick Street Oval. This was to be Yager's only VFL game.

Yager was also a member of the Cumberland Cricket Club and worked at the local Hoffman Brickworks, where he was active in the Pottery and Tile Association.

Yager died in Melbourne Hospital on 15 February 1915 following "a long illness from dropsy and heart trouble." The burial service was Church of England.

References

Holmesby, Russell & Main, Jim (2009). The Encyclopedia of AFL Footballers. 8th ed. Melbourne: Bas Publishing.

Australian rules footballers from Victoria (Australia)
Fitzroy Football Club players
1874 births
1915 deaths